The cadejo is a supernatural spirit that appears as a dog-shaped creature with blue eyes when it's calm and red eyes when it's attacking. It roams isolated roads at night, according to Central American folklore of indigenous origin. There is a good white cadejo and an evil black cadejo. Both are spirits that appear at night to travelers: the white cadejo protects them from harm and danger during their journey, while the black cadejo (sometimes an incarnation of the devil) tries to kill them. They usually appear in the form of a large (up to the size of a cow), shaggy dog with burning red eyes and goat's hooves, although in some areas they have more bull-like characteristics. According to the stories, many have tried to kill the black cadejo but have failed and perished. It is also said that if a cadejo is killed, it will smell terrible for several days, and then its body will disappear. Some Guatemalan and Salvadoran folklore also tells of a cadejo that protects drunks against anyone who tries to rob or hurt them. When the cadejo is near, it is said to bring a strong goat-like smell. Turning one's back on the cadejo or speaking to it are said to induce insanity.

In popular etymology, the name cadejo is thought to have derived from the Spanish word , meaning "chain"; the cadejo is at times represented as dragging a chain behind him. There is a fairly large member of the weasel family, the tayra, which in common speech is called a cadejo and is cited as a possible source of the legend.

In Guatemala, El Salvador, Honduras, Costa Rica and Nicaragua the dog-like creature is known as El Cadejo. It is said to look like a dog but is not a dog, has deer-like hooves and also moves like a deer, rather than a dog. The white Cadejos are known to be benevolent and eat bell-like flowers that only grow on volcanoes. The white Cadejo protects people, including drunks, vagabonds, and people with grudges from all evil foot steps, even La Siguanaba, and bad choices, which are sometimes caused by the evil black Cadejo. The black Cadejo is malevolent and lures people to make bad choices. The black Cadejo has glowing purple eyes and eats newborn babies. Sometimes the black Cadejo is said to be the devil himself. The black Cadejo is said to be able to stand on two feet like a man and swiftly throw punches at its victims. The book  (Magic Dogs of the Volcanoes), by Manlio Argueta, describes the Cadejos as mythical dog-like creatures that figure prominently in the folklore of El Salvador. They mysteriously appear at night and lovingly protect the villagers who live on the slopes of the volcanoes from danger. In Guatemala and El Salvador, the legend of El Cadejo revolves around La Siguanaba and El Cipitio legends.

Characteristics 
The evil cadejo ranges in size, according to different tales in various regions. It lurks in graveyards and dark alleys, waiting to attack a passing victim. It has a distinctive smell of concentrated urine and burning sulphur. It rattles with a jerking motion, contracting its pharynx. Its gaze freezes anyone who makes eye contact. Its skin and short hair, similar to those of a pig, glitter in the pitch dark.

There are three types of black cadejos:

The first is the devil himself in the form of a large, wounded dog with hoofed feet that are bound with red-hot chains. It is said that not even the white cadejo is able to completely stop him. Unlike the regular black cadejo, it is not likely to pursue and attack a passing person, as it is a scout - the eyes of evil. Instead, anyone who spots him will have a sad event.  In the short story "Leyenda del Cadejo" ("Legend of the Cadejo") by Nobel Prize laureate Miguel Ángel Asturias, this variety of cadejo terrorizes a young abbess and robs her of her braid.

The second type of cadejo is a mysterious evil dog. It kills and savagely tears through its victim. First, it demoralizes him with a series of sounds and other signs that it is nearby. Then, after the victim is scared, it leaps, and will kill him if the white cadejo is not near.

The third and least powerful type of black cadejo is the offspring of a normal dog and the "regular" cadejo. It is a mortal hybrid and can (with difficulty) be killed by a strong man (bearing in mind that most men in those regions only carry a machete for protection).  Once dead, it will completely rot in a matter of seconds, leaving behind a stain of evil, on which grass and moss will never grow again. This cadejo will never bite its victim. Instead, he kicks and pecks them with his snout. After this happens, people say  which means "he\she was handled by the cadejo". The victim goes mad. This term is sometimes applied to people that are born with a mental illness.

A fairly popular version of the legend in El Salvador talks about two brothers who walk into the house of a black magician. During a storm, he asks the boys to help him with some logs for a fire. Both boys slack on the job but eat the man's food. Once he finds out the little bit of food he had is missing and that there is not enough wood for his fire, he puts a curse on the road that leads to the boys' village. Voices bother the boys and when they turn their backs on the voices they get turned into creatures: a white cadejo and a black one. After going back to their village in their cursed form they get kicked out and have no choice but to wander.

The legend

In the early 1900s, Juan Carlos was a guardian who lived in a thatched house near Los Arcos, in the country fields near La Aurora in Guatemala. He worked near Parroquia Vieja and arrived at his house at midnight. Almost all the time, his wife and small children spent the whole day alone, in the middle of the fields. Juan found a white dog when he arrived at his house one day. When the dog saw him coming, it would shake, turn around and disappear. Juan always tried to follow the dog, but he could never reach him. One day, when he arrived, the white dog did not move, and when he approached the dog, it did not make a single sound. But then Juan touched his paw, and all of a sudden it opened his eyes. Juan  was scared; the dog said, 'you do not need my help anymore'. Frightened, Juan exclaimed, 'what help'? And the dog said, in pain, 'I am a dog sent from above. My mission  was to protect you from any danger. But you had showed me you do not need my help anymore.' Right after that, the white dog closed his eyes. Juan buried him, and every time he came home, he remembered the white dog.

“El cadejo” originated in El Salvador. Legend says that a witch granted a gift of protection and power to only one family name. The family name is unknown but most villagers assume a certain family has it, even now in 2021. El cadejo attaches itself to people, especially children, who go through traumatic experiences. We spoke to the “family”, we believe el cadejo “lives” in, and they didn’t want to disclose the hosts name. But she is a female. Currently 19 years of age, married and has a child. Her family disclosed some of her past and she’s definitely a candidate according to the legends. We learned about the previous host, his name was not given, but it was her father who died back in April of 2011. El cadejo is known to have a good and dark side. Seems like the dark cadejo took charge for years until about 2 years ago when her life change and became a better person.

Cadejos portrayed in art and literature

The Guatemalan born artist, Carlos Loarca, born in 1937, was a painter known for utilizing the cadejo as a main motif in his paintings. As a child, Loarca was told the legend, and he believed that the cadejo protected his father, as he always came home safely from the cantina. As an adult, Loarca felt the protecting spirit, and helped him break his own alcohol habit. The cadejo first appeared in his paintings in the 1970s, and still is brought into reality through his paintings. Loarca states the "dog" has been a companion, guide, and has grown old with him. The cadejo is also seen in a lot of places like... Copán and Tegucigalpa which are places that are in Honduras.

El Cadejo is mentioned on an episode of Mystery Science Theater 3000, incorrectly portrayed as more caprine than canine.

Both the black and white Cadejos feature prominently in an episode of Victor and Valentino.

Greavard and it's evolved form: Houndstone in Pokémon Scarlet and Violet are based on a Cadejo.

The Salvadoran writer Manlio Argueta wrote a children's book describing the folklore of the cadejo called Magic Dogs of the Volcanoes: Los Perros Mágicos De Los Volcanes (1990). The bilingual Spanish-English edition is translated by Stacey Ross and illustrated by Elly Simmons.

The Black and White Divine Dogs summoned by Megumi Fushiguro in Jujutsu Kaisen are based on the Cadejo.

Death, a white Wolf and the Main Antagonist in Puss in Boots: The Last Wish, is based on the Cadejo.

References
 Burchell, Simon (2007) Phantom Black Dogs in Latin America, Heart of Albion Press edited by triniti r

See also
 Hellhound
 La llorona
 Madam Koi Koi
 Bloody Mary (folklore)
 Crybaby Bridge
 La Malinche
 Sayona
 The Silbón
 Cerberus

Mythological dogs
Mythological canines
Guatemalan folklore
Spanish-language Mesoamerican legendary creatures
Honduran culture
Mythology of the Americas
Salvadoran mythology
Central American mythology
Belizean folklore